The following is a list of stadiums in the Canadian Football League.

Current stadiums

Notes

Map of current stadiums

Future stadiums

Neutral site stadiums

Notes

Former stadiums

Defunct team stadiums

See also
List of stadiums in Canada
List of Canadian Football stadiums by capacity
List of current National Football League stadiums
List of soccer stadiums in Canada
List of indoor arenas in Canada
List of Canadian Premier League stadiums

References

External links
CFL stadiums on Ballparks.com

Stadiums
 
Canadian Football League
Football League stadiums